Mecyclothorax bryobius is a species of ground beetle in the subfamily Psydrinae. It was described by Britton in 1938.

References

bryobius
Beetles described in 1938